The 2019 Football Championship of Dnipropetrovsk Oblast was won by Skoruk Tomakivka.

League table

 FC VPK-Ahro Shevchenkivka joined the 2019–20 Ukrainian Second League.
 In bold are clubs that parallelly participated in the 2018–19 Ukrainian Football Amateur League.
 Lehioner Dnipro also participated in the 2019–20 Ukrainian Football Amateur League.

References

Football
Dnipropetrovsk
Dnipropetrovsk